The 2022–23 Egyptian Premier League is the 64th season of the Egyptian Premier League, the top Egyptian professional league for association football clubs, since its establishment in 1948. The season began on 18 October 2022 and will conclude in June 2023. The league fixtures were announced on 9 October 2022.

Decisions 
Due to the clubs' participation in continental competitions, the league's start date was delayed by 48 hours. A total of 6,000 spectators will be permitted, up from 2,000 at the start of the previous season. Matches were played during the World Cup. The league was suspended from 3 November through 18 November owing to the country hosting the 2022 United Nations Climate Change Conference.

Teams 
Aswan was the first team to be promoted on 10 May 2022 after a one-year absence. On the same day, El Dakhleya returned to the top flight after a three-year absence. The final team Haras El Hodoud won promotion on 13 May, after a two-year absence. They replaced Eastern Company, El Gouna and Misr Lel Makkasa.

Stadiums and locations

Personnel and kits

Managerial changes

Standings

League table

Results

Fixtures and results

Season statistics

Top goalscorers

Top assists

Notelist

References

2
2022 in Egyptian sport
2023 in Egyptian sport
Egyptian Premier League
Egypt